The Brazilian tuco-tuco (Ctenomys brasiliensis) is a tuco-tuco species. It is found mainly in the state of Minas Gerais in southeastern Brazil, though Charles Darwin mentions it during his trip through present-day Uruguay.

Description
The Brazilian tuco-tuco has a reddish-brown coat color. The tail has short hairs covering it. It is the largest species of its genus. The head-body length is about 300 mm and the tail is relatively short.

References

Tuco-tucos
Mammals described in 1826